The German Institute of Development and Sustainability (IDOS) is one of the leading think tanks for development policy worldwide. This has been attested in January 2013 by the ranking of the Global Go To Think Tanks Report (of the Think Tanks and Civil Societies Program (TTCSP)): For the fifth consecutive time, IDOS has been selected as one of the Top Ten influential think tanks and research institutions in the field of development policy worldwide. The German Institute of Development and Sustainability (IDOS) is one of only three European research institutes ranked in this Top Ten list. IDOS improved its visibility in the international context in the current ranking on a wide scale, such as in the categories Top Think Tanks in Western Europe, Top Think Tanks – Worldwide and Best Government Affiliated Think Tanks. Once again, IDOS belongs to the Top 20 institutions among the Think Tanks with the Most Innovative Policy Ideas/Proposals. Furthermore, IDOS was evaluated in a number of categories for the first time, e.g., within the category Think Tanks with Outstanding Policy-Oriented Research Programs) or in the field of knowledge marketing (Think Tanks with the Best External Relations/Public Engagement Program). The Institute is based in the UN-City of Bonn. IDOS builds bridges between theory and practice and works within international research networks. The key to IDOS’s success is its institutional independence, which is guaranteed by the Institute’s founding statute.

IDOS is a non-profit company with limited liability. The Institute’s institutional independence is guaranteed by its founding statute. The shareholders are the Federal Republic of Germany and the Federal State of North Rhine-Westphalia. The Institute was headed by Prof. Dr. Dirk Messner (Director) until 2018. Since March 2020, Anna-Katharina Hornidge leads the Institute as its Director. At present, IDOS has a staff of more than 200, two-thirds of whom are researchers.

Since its founding in 1964, the German Institute of Development and Sustainability (IDOS) has based its work on the interplay between Research, Consulting and Training. These three areas complement each other and are the factors responsible for the Institute’s distinctive profile.

Research and consulting 
IDOS draws together the knowledge of development research available worldwide, dedicating its work to key issues facing the future of development policy. IDOS’s research is theory-based, empirically backed, and application-oriented. It serves as the basis for the Institute’s consulting activities, which in turn provide the initiative for further research programmes. IDOS’s Postgraduate Training Programme is an integral component of the Research and Consulting process. The many years of experience of the Institute’s professional staff as well as the creative impulses generated by the future development experts and managers trained at the Institute serve to reinforce one another. The policy advice and consulting services IDOS provides are bearing on the framework conditions of development policy, including issues concerned with world economic policy, foreign policy, and security policy.

Training 
The Institute’s Postgraduate Training Programme is concentrated on courses dedicated to development-related themes and issues bound up with shaping the process of globalisation as well as with improving trainee communicative and social skills. The cornerstone of the Postgraduate Training Programme – field research carried out by small interdisciplinary groups in a developing country – serves to provide trainees with an opportunity to gain practical experience with what they have learned by participating in concrete consulting-oriented research projects. Once they have completed the Postgraduate Training Programme, the graduates find career opportunities with development organisations in Germany and abroad. The approximately 1,000 alumni of this program form a global network that makes it easier for the institute to anchor its research results and consulting services in the German, European and international networks of development policy. Well-known alumni include Achim Steiner, :de:Jutta Frasch, Hans-Joachim Preuss and :de:Ingrid-Gabriela Hoven.

In addition to the Postgraduate Training Programme, the German Institute of Development and Sustainability (IDOS) offers Young Professionals from selected partner countries of Germany’s international cooperation the participation in the “Managing Global Governance (MGG) Academy”. The highly qualified participants from Brazil, China, Egypt, India, Indonesia, Mexico, Pakistan and South Africa work in governments, Ministries, Universities, policy-orientated Think Tanks or research institutions. This unique exchange and learning opportunity supports the creation of a sustainable, equitable and effective global governance architecture.

Thematic focus 
The research staff is involved in numerous international renowned research projects and contributes to policy networks. Their research and publications focus on practice-oriented research, is divided into the following research fields and concentrates on the following regions:

 Inter- and Transnational Cooperation 
 Transformation of Economic and Social Systems 
 Governance, Statehood, Security
 Environmental Governance and Transformation to Sustainability 
 Transformation of Political (Dis-)order: Institutions, Values & Peace 
 Asia
 Central and Eastern Europe
 Latin America
 Near and Middle East, North Africa
 Sub-Saharan Africa
 Library and documentation

Library and documentation
The library of the German Institute of Development and Sustainability (IDOS) is structured like a public reference library. It has some 48,000 volumes, 150 periodicals and the most important German and English daily and weekly newspapers. IDOS places great value in maintaining and evaluating national and international periodicals. The evaluation follows the research and consulting activities of IDOS and the FIV rules. IDOS is a member of the German Information Network International Relations and Area Studies (Fachinformationsverbund Internationale Beziehungen und Länderkunde /FIV-IBLK). The indexing is part of the database "World Affairs Online” (WAO) and is searchable via the IREON portal. IDOS publications are part of the IBLK-catalogue.

External links
 German Institute of Development and Sustainability (IDOS)
 The German Information Network International Relations and Area Studies (FIV-IBLK)
 IREON Gateway International Relations and Area Studies
 IBLK Catalogue (Karlsruhe Virtual Catalogue, KVK)

1964 establishments in West Germany
Think tanks established in 1964
Think tanks based in Germany
Economy of Germany
Bonn
Organisations based in Bonn